The Hoop Life is an American drama series depicting the lives of a team of basketball players in the fictional UBA (United Basketball Association) that aired on Showtime from July 4, 1999 until March 19, 2000. starring Rick Peters as Greg Marr, Mykelti Williamson as Marvin Buxton, and Cirroc Lofton as b-ball prodigy Curtis Thorpe.

Cast
Rick Peters as Greg Marr
Mykelti Williamson as Marvin Buxton
Cirroc Lofton as Curtis Thorpe

Episodes

External links

American sports television series
Television series by CBS Studios
Showtime (TV network) original programming
English-language television shows
1990s American television series
1999 American television series debuts
2000 American television series endings